is a Japanese footballer who plays as a left back for Kawasaki Frontale.

Career statistics

Club

Honours

Japan
Asian Games (1) : 2010

Club
Kawasaki Frontale
J1 League (4) : 2017, 2018, 2020, 2021
J.League Cup (1) : 2019
Japanese Super Cup (1) : 2019

Individual
J.League Best XI (1) : 2020

References

External links

Profile at Kawasaki Frontale

1990 births
Living people
Association football people from Osaka Prefecture
People from Higashiōsaka
Japanese footballers
J1 League players
Kawasaki Frontale players
Asian Games medalists in football
Footballers at the 2010 Asian Games
Asian Games gold medalists for Japan
Association football defenders
Medalists at the 2010 Asian Games